Judge Platt may refer to:

Casper Platt (1892–1965), judge of the United States District Court for the Eastern District of Illinois
James Perry Platt (1851–1913), judge of the United States District Court for the District of Connecticut
Thomas Collier Platt Jr. (1925–2017), judge of the United States District Court for the Eastern District of New York
Thomas Joshua Platt (1788–1862), British judge who served as a Baron of the Exchequer